Tatsuyuki Uemoto (上本 達之, born November 8, 1980, in Ube, Yamaguchi) is a Japanese professional baseball catcher for the Saitama Seibu Lions in Japan's Nippon Professional Baseball.

External links

NPB.com

1980 births
Japanese baseball players
Living people
Nippon Professional Baseball catchers
Saitama Seibu Lions players
Seibu Lions players
Baseball people from Yamaguchi Prefecture
Japanese baseball coaches
Nippon Professional Baseball coaches